Aremu is a surname. Notable people with the surname include:

Afeez Aremu (born 1999), Nigerian footballer
Issa Aremu (born 1961), Nigerian trade union activist and labor leader
Mike Aremu, Nigerian saxophone player

See also
Aremu (given name)

Surnames of Nigerian origin